Arnold's Cove (2016 Population 949) is a town on Newfoundland's Avalon Peninsula in the province of Newfoundland and Labrador, Canada. It is in Division 1 on Placentia Bay.

The name is found in population returns of 1836, and may have been given after the forename of a fisherman.
In 1864 there was one family, and by 1893 there was a post office. It was a fishing settlement located approximately two kilometers from the Newfoundland Railway, located 35 miles from Placentia Junction.

It was a Local Improvement District in 1967 and incorporated as a town the same year. It had a population of 100 in 1911 and 1,160 in 1976. It has been a center of economic growth recently, due to its proximity to projects involved with the Hibernia offshore oil platform.

Demographics

Attractions

Hiking Trails 
Arnold's Cove is home to three hiking trials varying in length from a 12 km loop to a 2 km there-and-back. Bordeaux Trail is the longest, followed by the Old Cabot Highway to Arthur's Hill Trail with the Otter Rub/War Path Trail being the shortest of the three. All three trails are rated as Moderate or Easy/Moderate.

Lookout Points 
Two lookout points exist within the town of Arnold's Cove. The Placentia Bay Lookout sits at the top of a hill, providing scenic views westward over Placentia Bay. Ivy's Lookout is small, mostly unmarked, and sits right on the water of Arnold's Cove itself, also looking west. Additionally, the Big Pond Bird Sanctuary, also known as the Arnold's Cove Bird Sanctuary, offers east-facing views of a tidal inlet that is home to local waterfowl.

Historic Buildings 
The Drake House is a home built in 1890 by George and John Drake in a standard Georgian style. It was awarded Heritage Designation by the Heritage Foundation of Newfoundland and Labrador in 2003.

Religious Buildings and Cemeteries 
Modern Arnold's Cove has four churches and no other listed religious buildings. It also has three cemeteries, two affiliated with the Anglican Church and one with the Salvation Army Church.

See also
 List of cities and towns in Newfoundland and Labrador

References

Populated coastal places in Canada
Towns in Newfoundland and Labrador